Dipodium pictum, commonly known as brittle climbing-orchid or climbing hyacinth-orchid, is an orchid species that is native to Malesia (including Indonesia and New Guinea) and the Cape York Peninsula in Australia.

Description
Dipodium pictum is a slender vine with leaves that are arranged in a single plane These have overlapping bases and are about 30 to 40 cm long and 2 to 3 cm wide. The flowers are about 5 cm in diameter and have maroon spots.

Taxonomy
The species was formally described in 1849 in The Journal of the Horticultural Society of London by English botanist John Lindley who gave it the name Wailesia picta. It was transferred to the genus Dipodium by German botanist Heinrich Gustav Reichenbach in 1862.

Dipodium pandanum, a species formally described by Frederick Manson Bailey in 1902, is treated as a synonym of Dipodium pictum in the Australian Plant Census. However, the World Checklist of Selected Plant Families records it as a synonym of Dipodium scandens. The type specimen for Dipodum pandanum was collected near Samarai in Papua New Guinea.

Distribution
In Australia it is found within or on the edge of rainforest, often near watercourses, at altitudes ranging from 200 to 400 metres. Only four specimens have been recorded in Australia; from Kutini-Payamu National Park and a timber reserve in the McIlwraith Range on the Cape York Peninsula.

Conservation
In Australia, the species is listed as "endangered" under the Commonwealth Environment Protection and Biodiversity Conservation Act as well as Queensland's Nature Conservation Act.

References

External links

pictum
Orchids of Indonesia
Orchids of New Guinea
Orchids of Queensland